Bomarea borjae is a species of flowering plant in the family Alstroemeriaceae. It is endemic to Ecuador. It is known only from two collections made in the caldera of the dormant volcano Pululagua over 100 years ago. It is not a well-known species and is threatened by habitat loss.

Sources

Endemic flora of Ecuador
borjae
Data deficient plants
Taxonomy articles created by Polbot
Plants described in 1908